‘Īsá ibn Ja‘far al-Ḥasanī (died 994/5) was the second Musawid Emir of Mecca. He reigned in the late tenth century after his father Ja'far. Although the exact year he took office is not recorded, Ibn Khaldun writes that he was Emir in 366 AH (976/977). In that year the Fatimid army beset Mecca and Medina to enforce the khutbah in the name of the Fatimid caliph al-Aziz. Isa died in 384 AH (994/995) and was succeeded by his brother Abu al-Futuh. He had no descendants.

References 

Sharifs of Mecca
Vassal rulers of the Fatimid Caliphate
10th-century Arabs
10th-century births
990s deaths
Year of birth unknown
Year of death uncertain